Harold Dow (September 28, 1947 – August 21, 2010) was an American television news correspondent, journalist, and investigative journalism with CBS News.

Early life and career 
Dow was born in Hackensack, New Jersey. He attended the University of Nebraska at Omaha. He was a member of Kappa Alpha Psi fraternity.

When Dow became co-anchor and talk-show host for KETV in Omaha, Nebraska, he became the first African-American television reporter. Dow had also been an anchor and reporter at Theta Cable TV in Santa Monica, California and a news anchor for WPAT Radio in Paterson, New Jersey. Dow was a co-anchor for the CBS overnight news program CBS News Nightwatch (1982-1983), a correspondent for the CBS News magazine Street Stories (1992–93), and had reported for the CBS Evening News and CBS News Sunday Morning since the early 1970s.

Dow joined CBS News in 1972, first as a broadcast associate, then as a correspondent with their Los Angeles Bureau while with KCOP-TV.

Personal life
Harold Dow married Kathleen (Starks) Dow in 1980. They had three children together.

Death
A resident of Upper Saddle River, New Jersey, Dow died from complications of asthma on August 21, 2010, behind the wheel of his car.

References

External links
Harold Dow's Bio Sketch at CBS News
Beyond The Boardwalk:Dow Reports on 4 grisly killings in Atlantic City
48 Hours correspondent Harold Dow reports: Point Break, Pt. 1: A man's obsession may have led to his own death, originally aired 5/17/2008.
48 Hours correspondent Harold Dow reports: Point Break, Pt. 2: A man's obsession may have led to his own death, originally aired 5/17/2008.

1947 births
2010 deaths
American male journalists
American television news anchors
African-American television personalities
Respiratory disease deaths in New Jersey
Deaths from asthma
People from Hackensack, New Jersey
People from Upper Saddle River, New Jersey
University of Nebraska Omaha alumni
CBS News people
Burials at George Washington Memorial Park (Paramus, New Jersey)
20th-century African-American people
21st-century African-American people